The 2022–23 Albany Great Danes men's basketball team represented the University at Albany, SUNY in the 2022–23 NCAA Division I men's basketball season. They played their home games at the McDonough Sports Complex in Troy, New York due to the ongoing renovations of SEFCU Arena on the main campus. They were led by second-year head coach Dwayne Killings. They finished the season 8–23, 3–13 in America East play to finish in last place. They failed to qualify for the America East Tournament.

Previous season
The Great Danes finished the 2021–22 season 13–18, 9–9 in America East play to finish in a tie for fifth place. They lost in the quarterfinals of the America East tournament to Hartford.

Roster

Schedule and results

|-
!colspan=12 style=| Exhibition

|-
!colspan=12 style=| Non-conference regular season

|-
!colspan=12 style=| America East Conference regular season

References

Albany Great Danes men's basketball seasons
Albany Great Danes
2022 in sports in New York (state)
2023 in sports in New York (state)